The Revolutionary Student Brigade (RSB) was a Marxist-Leninist student organization active in the 1970s in the United States. The RSB was founded at a conference on June 15–17, 1974 which was attended by about 450 students from 80 campuses. Its predecessor was the Attica Brigade, which was one grouping that can be traced to the Students for a Democratic Society (SDS) split in 1969. The RSB was the student organization associated with the Revolutionary Union, which became the Revolutionary Communist Party in 1975.

The Attica Brigade was an anti-imperialist student organization in the United States in the early 1970s. It was initiated in 1972 by the Revolutionary Union. In 1974 the Attica Brigade changed its name to the Revolutionary Student Brigade at a conference on June 15–17.

The Attica Brigade aimed to fill the vacuum of left wing activism on campuses after Students for a Democratic Society split in 1969. The name of the organization is inspired by the Attica prison uprising in 1971. Attica Brigade organized an Eastern regional conference that drew 250 attendants from 31 campus chapters in New York on March 31 - April 1, 1973.

When the RCP split in 1977 this struggle was reflected in the RSB; a significant section of the Revolutionary Student Brigade left the RCP, taking the RSB name with them.  They joined the Revolutionary Workers Headquarters, a new Marxist-Leninist organization which emerged from the RCP. Those who remained in the RCP and renamed their organization the Revolutionary Communist Youth Brigade.  Disagreement over how to organize students and youth played a role in the RCP-RWH split.

In 1980, what was left of the RSB joined with the Student Coalition Against Nukes Nationwide (SCANN) and Midwest Coalition Against Registration and the Draft (MidCARD) to found a new organization, the Progressive Student Network.  Prior to this merger, RSB cadre had been active in both of the other two organizations.

See also
Revolutionary Youth Movement

Defunct Maoist organizations in the United States
1974 establishments in the United States
1980 disestablishments in the United States
Revolutionary Communist Party, USA